Paddington is a London Underground station served by the Circle and Hammersmith & City lines. It is located adjacent to the north side of Paddington mainline station and has entrances from within the mainline station and from Paddington Basin. The station is between Royal Oak and Edgware Road and is in London Fare Zone 1.

The station is one of two separate Underground stations of the same name. The other station, on Praed Street to the south of the mainline station, is served by the Bakerloo, Circle and District lines. Although shown on the London Underground map as a single station, the two stations are not directly linked and interchange between them is via the concourse of the mainline station.

History

Metropolitan Railway

The station was opened as Paddington (Bishop's Road) by the Metropolitan Railway (MR, later the Metropolitan line) on 10 January 1863 as the western terminus of the world's first underground railway. The station building was located on the road bridge carrying Bishop's Road (now Bishop's Bridge Road) over the mainline tracks of the Great Western Railway (GWR). Services were initially operated with rolling stock provided by the GWR, and the MR route to Farringdon was laid with dual-gauge track for both broad-gauge and standard-gauge trains.

On 9 May 1864, the boiler exploded on the engine of a train about to leave the station eastbound. The driver and fireman, a member of staff on the platform and a passenger on a train arriving from the east were injured. The canopy and end screen of the station's roof, the side wall of the platform stairs and the carriage of the arriving train were all damaged.

On 13 June 1864, GWR services were extended westward when the Hammersmith & City Railway (H&CR) opened to Hammersmith. MR services began operating to Hammersmith in 1865. These opened on 30 October 1871.

MR trains to Gloucester Road served a separate station named Paddington (Praed Street) south of the main-line station. Paddington (Bishop's Road) station was given its current name on 10 September 1933.

From 1 August 1872, the '"Middle Circle"' service also began operations through the station running from Moorgate then over the Hammersmith branch to Latimer Road then, via a now demolished link, to the West London Line to Addison Road and the District Railway (DR, later the District line) to Mansion House. The service was operated jointly by the GWR and the DR. The service ended on 31 January 1905.

Until 1990, services through the station were shown on maps as part of the MR and, later the Metropolitan line. They were separately identified as the Hammersmith & City line in 1990.

Circle line

In December 2009, Circle line services began serving the station. Originally operating as a loop-line using tracks constructed by the MR and the DR and serving only the station in Praed Street, the Circle line's route was altered to include the Hammersmith branch to increase train frequency on the branch and improve the regularity of Circle line trains. Trains run in a spiral anti-clockwise from Edgware Road around the loop, back to Edgware Road and then on to the Hammersmith branch.

The station was rebuilt during 2012 and 2013 to provide longer platforms, improved access and connections to the mainline station. A new entrance to Paddington Basin was opened.

Accidents and incidents
On 9 May 1864, the boiler of a Great Northern Railway 0-6-0 locomotive exploded as it was leaving Bishops Road.

Services
The station is in London Fare Zone 1 between Royal Oak and Edgware Road stations. Train frequencies vary throughout the day, but, generally, Hammersmith & City line trains operate every 10 minutes from approximately 04:50 to 00:42 eastbound and 05:22 to 00:53 westbound; they are supplemented by Circle line trains every 10 minutes from approximately 04:58 to 23:43 eastbound and 06:40 to 00:45 westbound. Both lines use the same tracks.

Connections
London Buses routes 46 and 332 serve Bishop's Bridge Road, north of the station. Other bus routes serve the station in Praed Street.

Notes and references

Notes

References

Bibliography

External links

 London Transport Museum Photographic Archive
 
 

Circle line (London Underground) stations
Hammersmith & City line stations
Tube stations in the City of Westminster
Former Great Western Railway stations 
Former Metropolitan Railway stations
Railway stations in Great Britain opened in 1863
1863 establishments in England